Stapleton is an English surname dating back to the times of Anglo-Saxon tribes of Britain. It is a habitation name; examples of habitations are found in Cumbria, Gloucestershire, Herefordshire, Leicestershire, Shropshire, Somerset, and Yorkshire, and is from the Old English word stapol meaning post and ton meaning settlement. 

Notable people and characters with the surname include:

Arts and entertainment 
 Chris Stapleton (born 1978), American singer-songwriter 
 Cyril Stapleton (1914–1975), British violinist and band leader
 Fergal Stapleton (born 1961), Irish artist
 Jacinta Stapleton (born 1979), Australian actress
 Jean Stapleton (1923–2013), American actress
 Liam Stapleton, Australian radio presenter
 Maureen Stapleton (1925–2006), American actress
 Nicola Stapleton (born 1974), English actress
 Oliver Stapleton (born 1948), English cinematographer
 Peter Stapleton (born 1954), New Zealand musician
 Rita Stapleton, a heroine on the CBS soap opera The Guiding Light during the 1970s and early '80s
 Robyn Stapleton, Scottish singer
 Steven Stapleton (born 1957), British musician
 Sullivan Stapleton (born 1977), Australian actor

Business 
 Bob Stapleton (born 1958), American entrepreneur
 Patrick J. Stapleton III (active from 1997), member of the Pennsylvania Liquor Control Board, son of Patrick J. Stapleton, Jr.
 Thomas Stapleton (antiquary) (1805–1849), English landowner
 Walker Stapleton (born 1974), American businessman and state treasurer

Military 
 Deryck Stapleton (1918–2018), British bomber pilot and Air Vice Marshal
 Gerald Stapleton (1920–2010), British fighter pilot
 Sir Miles Stapleton (1408–1466), English knight
 Sir Miles Stapleton of Bedale or of Cotherstone (1320?–1364), English knight

Politics and government 
 Benjamin F. Stapleton (1869–1950), American politician
Charles W. Stapleton (1853–1935), American lawyer and politician
 Craig Roberts Stapleton (born 1945), U.S. ambassador
 John Stapleton (MP) (1816–1891)
 Patrick J. Stapleton Jr. (1924–2001), U.S. politician in Pennsylvania, father of Patrick J. Stapleton III
 Philip Stapleton (1603–1647), English politician
 Richard F. Stapleton (1831–?), American politician
 Sheryl Williams Stapleton (born 1958), American politician
 Thomas J. Stapleton (born 1947), Democratic member of the Pennsylvania House of Representatives
 Walker Stapleton (born 1974), American politician
 Walter King Stapleton (born 1934), American federal judge
 William Stapleton (MP for Carlisle), MP for Carlisle
 Sir William Stapleton, 1st Baronet, also see List of colonial governors of Nevis
 Sir William Stapleton, 4th Baronet (c. 1698 – 1740), English politician, son of the governor

Scholars 
Henry Ernest Stapleton (1878–1962), English chemist and historian of alchemy and chemistry

Sports

Baseball 
 Dave Stapleton (infielder) (born 1954), baseball player who played with the Boston Red Sox 1980–86
 Dave Stapleton (pitcher) (born 1961), baseball player who played with the Milwaukee Brewers 1987–88

Football (soccer) 
 Frank Stapleton (born 1956), Irish association and Manchester United football player
 Jessie Stapleton (born 2005), Irish association football player
 Laurence Stapleton, English footballer
 Paul Stapleton, English football executive
 Rory Stapleton, Irish Gaelic football player

Football (American) 
 Clay Stapleton (1921–2014), American football player and coach
 Darnell Stapleton (born 1985), American football player

Ice hockey 
 Mike Stapleton (born 1966), American ice hockey player
 Pat Stapleton (ice hockey) (1940–2020), Canadian ice hockey player
 Tim Stapleton (born 1982), American ice hockey player

Other sports 
 Brett Stapleton (born 1987), Australian rugby union player
 Craig Stapleton (rugby league) (born 1978), Australian rugby league footballer
 Eddie Stapleton (1930–2005), Australian rugby union player
 Harold Stapleton (1915–2015), Australian cricketer
 Jim Stapleton (1863–1949), Irish hurler
 Paddy Stapleton (born 1985), Irish hurler
 Thomas Stapleton (hurler) (born 1988), Irish hurler
 Timmy Stapleton, Irish hurler
 Tom Stapleton (footballer) (1907–1977), Australian rules footballer
 Tom Stapleton (hurler), Irish athlete

Journalism 
 John Stapleton (born 1946), English journalist
 John Stapleton (Australian journalist)
 Sally Stapleton (born 1957), American photojournalist

Religion 
 Ruth Carter Stapleton (1929–1983), American Christian evangelist
 Theobald Stapleton (1589–1647), Irish Roman Catholic priest
 Thomas Stapleton (theologian) (1535–1598), English Catholic controversialist

Other fields 
 Augustus Stapleton (1800–1880), British biographer and political pamphleteer

Disambiguation pages 
 Craig Stapleton (disambiguation), several persons
 Dave Stapleton (disambiguation), several persons
 John Stapleton (disambiguation), several persons
 Patrick Stapleton (disambiguation), several persons
 Thomas Stapleton (disambiguation), several persons
 William Stapleton (disambiguation), several persons

Fictional characters 
 Jack and Beryl Stapleton, characters from The Hound of the Baskervilles
 The Stapleton family, the main characters in a series of historical novels by Thomas Fleming

Notes 

English toponymic surnames